Oakland is a city in St. Louis County, Missouri, United States. The population was 1,381 at the 2010 census.

Geography
Oakland is located at  (38.575869, -90.384539).

Demographics

2010 census
As of the census of 2010, there were 1,381 people, 452 households, and 324 families living in the city. The racial makeup of the city was 96.2% White, 2.2% African American, 0.1% Native American, 0.4% Asian, and 1.1% from two or more races. Hispanic or Latino of any race were 1.0% of the population.

There were 452 households, of which 32.3% had children under the age of 18 living with them, 61.1% were married couples living together, 8.8% had a female householder with no husband present, 1.8% had a male householder with no wife present, and 28.3% were non-families. 24.3% of all households were made up of individuals, and 11.5% had someone living alone who was 65 years of age or older. The average household size was 2.43 and the average family size was 2.90.

The median age in the city was 52.7 years. 18.2% of residents were under the age of 18; 3.5% were between the ages of 18 and 24; 18.7% were from 25 to 44; 27.7% were from 45 to 64; and 32.1% were 65 years of age or older. The gender makeup of the city was 40.0% male and 60.0% female.

2000 census
As of the census of 2000, there were 1,540 people, 448 households, and 340 families living in the city. The racial makeup of the city was 97.34% White, 1.69% African American, 0.52% Asian, 0.19% from other races, and 0.26% from two or more races. Hispanic or Latino of any race were 0.65% of the population.

There were 448 households, out of which 33.3% had children under the age of 18 living with them, 66.5% were married couples living together, 8.0% had a female householder with no husband present, and 23.9% were non-families. 21.4% of all households were made up of individuals, and 9.2% had someone living alone who was 65 years of age or older. The average household size was 2.48 and the average family size was 2.87.

In the city, the population was spread out, with 16.8% under the age of 18, 3.1% from 18 to 24, 20.7% from 25 to 44, 20.9% from 45 to 64, and 38.5% who were 65 years of age or older. The median age was 52 years. For every 100 females, there were 67.2 males. For every 100 females age 18 and over, there were 59.1 males.

The median income for a household in the city was $65,000, and the median income for a family was $71,250. Males had a median income of $60,063 versus $37,132 for females. The per capita income for the city was $27,583. About 2.3% of families and 3.1% of the population were below the poverty line, including 3.5% of those under age 18 and 5.2% of those age 65 or over.

Education
The all-girls Roman Catholic High School Ursuline Academy is located in the city of Oakland. St. Louis County Library operates the Oak Bend Branch in Oakland.

References

External links
 City of Oakland official website

Cities in St. Louis County, Missouri
Cities in Missouri